The Theater in der Leopoldstadt (also: Leopoldstädter Theater) was an opera house in the Leopoldstadt district of Vienna, founded in 1781 by Karl von Marinelli, following the Schauspielfreiheit (ending of the court's monopoly on entertainment) by Joseph II in 1776. The 19th-century summer stage called the Thaliatheater was also managed by the Leopoldstadt.

In its early years, the theatre staged Singspiele and Possen mit Gesang, notably by the theatre's Kapellmeister Wenzel Müller and his assistant Ferdinand Kauer. The dramatist Ferdinand Raimund worked with the theatre in the 1820s.

The theatre was eventually demolished and rebuilt in 1847, under the name of the Carltheater.

Premieres
1784: Der Streit zwischen dem Zauberer Scionco und der Fee Galantina, oder Kasperl bleibt Kasperl, comedy with machines and music by Ferdinand Kauer
1784: Harlekin auf dem Parade Beth, große Pantomime by Wenzel Müller
1790: Das Sonnenfest der Braminen heroisch-komisches Singspiel by Müller
1791: Kaspar der Fagottist oder Die Zauberzither, Singspiel by Müller
1793: Das neue Sonntagskind Singspiel by Müller
1794: Die Schwestern von Prag, Singspiel by Müller
1797: Das lustige Beylager, Singspiel by Müller
1798: Das Donauweibchen, romantisch-komisches Volksmärchen by Kauer
1799: Die Teufels Mühle am Wienerberg, Schauspiel mit Gesang by Müller
1804: Die Belagerung von Ypsilon, Karikaturoperette by Müller
1807: Javima, Oper by Müller
1808: Samson, Melodram by Müller
1809: Simon Plattkopf, der Unsichtbare, Singspiel by Müller
1816: Der Fiaker al Marquis, komische Oper by Müller
1822: Aline oder Wien in einem andern Welttheil Zauberoper by Müller
1823: Der Barometermacher auf der Zauberinsel Zauberposse by Müller to a text by Ferdinand Raimund
1825: Der schwarze See, Zauberspiel (posse)
1826: Herr Josef und Frau Baberl, Posse by Müller
1828: Die gefesselte Phantasie, Zauberspiel (Posse) by Müller to a text by Raimund
1828: Der Alpenkönig und der Menschenfeind, romantisch-komisches Zauberspiel (Posse) by Müller to a text by Raimund

Bibliography
 Grund, H.: Das Leopoldstädter "Kasperltheater" 1781 bis 1831. Vienna, University, Dissertation, 1921
 Hadamowsky, Franz: Das Theater in der Leopoldstadt von 1781 bis 1860. Vienna : Höfel, 1934

References
Carner, Mosco at al. (1992), 'Vienna' in The New Grove Dictionary of Opera, ed. Stanley Sadie (London) 

Opera houses in Vienna
Cultural venues in Vienna
Former theatres in Vienna
Buildings and structures in Leopoldstadt
Theatres completed in 1781
Music venues completed in 1781
1781 establishments in Austria
Buildings and structures demolished in 1847
Demolished buildings and structures in Austria